"A Great Big Sled" is a song by Las Vegas-based rock band The Killers. It was recorded in mid-November 2006 with record producer Alan Moulder as a one-off track and the band's Christmas 2006 single. Moulder's wife Toni Halliday, the former lead vocalist of Curve, features on backing vocals.

The song was released , as a download from the iTunes Store. All of the proceeds from this song went to AIDS charities as part of Bono's RED campaign. A music video was released for the single, containing "candid" clips of the band members participating in various holiday celebration.

Chart performance
"A Great Big Sled" entered the UK Official Download Chart the week of December 18, 2006 at number 11. The song also charted in the Billboard Hot 100 at number 54.

Track listing

CD: Island / ISLR 16690-2
 "A Great Big Sled" - 4:15

 US promo CD

Charts

References

External links
"Great Big Sled" song at AOL Music
"Great Big Sled" video at Yahoo Music

2006 singles
American Christmas songs
Christmas charity singles
The Killers songs
Song recordings produced by Alan Moulder
Songs written by Brandon Flowers
Songs written by Dave Keuning
Songs written by Ronnie Vannucci Jr.
Songs written by Mark Stoermer
2006 songs